This article is a list of diseases of asparagus (Asparagus officinalis).

Fungal diseases

Viral and viroid diseases

Miscellaneous diseases and disorders

References 

 Common Names of Diseases, The American Phytopathological Society
 Asparagus Diseases (Fact Sheets and Information Bulletins), The Cornell Plant Pathology Vegetable Disease Web Page

Asparagus
Asparagus
Stem vegetable diseases